Romance on the Orient Express is a 1985 British romantic drama television film directed by Lawrence Gordon Clark. It premiered on NBC in the United States on 4 March and aired on ITV in the United Kingdom on 17 November. The film stars Cheryl Ladd and Stuart Wilson, with John Gielgud, Renée Asherson, Ralph Michael, Ruby Wax, and Julian Sands in supporting roles.

Plot 
Lily Parker is a sophisticated American magazine editor on a business trip in Europe with her outgoing best friend Susan Lawson. Susan persuades her to travel from Venice to Paris by train, rather than by plane. They board the Orient Express, where Susan hopes to find romance. Meanwhile, the atmosphere reminds Lily of a train trip 10 years earlier, when she was a 19-year-old college student traveling through Europe with her friend Stacey. On that trip she met Alex Woodward, an aristocratic Englishman who courted her but then disappeared completely.

On the present day trip, Lily unexpectedly runs into Alex on the train, who admits that this meeting is no coincidence. Enraged over the past, she refuses to talk to him. Through flashbacks, their past story is slowly revealed. They had met on a train 10 years earlier, when they travelled together and fell deeply in love. Alex wanted to marry her, but his friend Sandy assured him that his father would never approve. After arriving in Paris, instead of meeting her one evening, Alex was summoned away by his father and never returned.

In the present, Alex persuades Lily to have dinner with him, but past conflicts causes her to leave prematurely. She later returns, deciding to give him another chance. They reveal that they were both married for five years and then divorced, but only Lily's marriage produced a child, a daughter who has, Lily says, just turned three. Alex reveals that his father pressured him into marrying someone else, and that he never regretted anything more than leaving her. The conversation soon escalates into a passionate affair, but the next morning Lily makes clear that she has no desire to reignite their relationship or to see him again. They go their separate ways and Alex leaves the Orient Express, until he finds out by accident from Susan that Lily's daughter, Alexandra (Lexa), is really nine years old, which means that he must be her father. He decides to follow Lily and Susan to Paris in a dilapidated old car which he has quickly bought for the journey.

Meanwhile, Lily regrets her decision of sending Alex away and for not telling him the truth about their daughter. She fears she will never love again, and decides to marry the man she had planned to meet in London at the end of this trip. Meanwhile Alex arrives in Paris by car and is frantically searching for them. On their last day in Paris, however, Alex finds Lily with Susan and Lexa at the restaurant where he had promised to meet her 10 years earlier. Alex cannot help but stare at Lexa, until Lily sees him with tears streaming down his cheeks and walks over and embraces him. As the shot pans out, we see Lexa walking over towards her parents.

Cast
 Cheryl Ladd as Lily Parker
 Stuart Wilson as Alex Woodward
 John Gielgud as Theodore Woodward
 Ruby Wax as Susan Lawson
 Danielle Tylke as Lexa
 Julian Sands as Sandy
 Betsy Brantley as Stacey
 Renée Asherson as Beatrice
 Ralph Michael as Harry
 Barry Stokes as Flavio

Production
The film was shot on location in Italy, France and England. Shortly before its premiere, Cheryl Ladd expressed her delight in Romance on the Orient Express, because the film, due to its time span of 10 years, allowed her to play two different characters.

Awards and nominations

References

External links
 

1985 films
1985 television films
1985 romantic drama films
1980s British films
1980s English-language films
British drama television films
British romantic drama films
Romance television films
Films set on the Orient Express
Films set in Paris
Films set in Venice
Films shot in Leeds
Films shot in Paris
Films shot in Venice
NBC network original films